The Diggers Club is Australia's largest gardening club, with over 85,000 members.

They were established in 1978 to ensure access to diverse seeds and plants which were disappearing from circulation and became champions of the heirloom fruit and vegetable revival in the 1990s.

The club has been a staunch advocate for public control of our seed supply and against its corporatization through GM foods. In 2011, The Blazey family gifted the Diggers Club and its two historic gardens public gardens – Heronswood and The Garden of St Erth – to the charitable Diggers Foundation to ensure the Digger's legacy will continue to inspire and educate Australian gardeners into the future.

Gardens

Heronswood 
Located on the beautiful Mornington Peninsula, Heronswood is the home of The Diggers Foundation.

Showcasing the best flowers and plants for Australian conditions, the garden changes throughout the year and peaks in summer with wonderful planting combinations of summer perennials and heirloom vegetables.

Visit Heronswood for garden inspiration year round, dine in the cafe housed within the historic Heronswood House and shop for the best range of heirloom seeds, plants and more in our garden shop.
Heronswood is listed on the Register of the National Estate. It is also listed in Oxford Companion to Gardens as one of only four gardens in Victoria, alongside the Melbourne Botanical Gardens, Mawallock and Rippon Lea.
The first law professor at Melbourne University, William Hearn, employed Edward Latrobe Bateman to design Heronswood's main house in 1866. The house, which is of an asymmetric Gothic Revival design, was completed in 1871.

The Garden of St Erth 
In 1854 Matthew Rogers, a Cornish stonemason, left Sydney in pursuit of gold discovered near Mount Blackwood in Victoria. In the 1860s he built a sandstone cottage, naming it "St Erth" after his birthplace in Cornwall now restored and forming the centrepiece of the gardens.

Just one hour from Melbourne, not far from Daylesford and Ballarat, The Garden of St Erth is a secluded getaway.  Each season has something to offer, including carpets of daffodils in spring, long-flowering flower borders in summer, an espalier fruit orchard and magnificent autumn garden colour.

During the Gold Rush, the site was a town of 13,000 people and feverish activity. Now, 160 years later, you can visit the last remaining stone cottage as the home of our garden shop. Here you can browse a wide range of incredible edibles, hardy perennials and shrubs and stock up on the full range of Diggers heirloom seeds for the vegetable and flower garden.

Relax over coffee in the cafe and stay on for lunch, morning or afternoon tea, or even overnight in our Garden Beds glamping.

Cloudehill 
Cloudehill has been made by Jeremy Francis from one of the ‘home’ properties of the famous Woolrich family Rangeview nursery & flower farm. In 1895, George Woolrich was granted a ‘Village Settlement’ ten-acre block which he cleared and planted to cherries and raspberries. In 1919 his sons, Jim and Ted, took over the property and commenced work on their Rangeview project. Rangeview was to be the first of many ornamental plant nurseries in the Dandenongs in those years and operated through to the late 1960s.

Ted Woolrich, in 1922, began a correspondence with Ernest Chinese Wilson. Wilson was one of the legendary ‘plant hunters’ and famous for bringing treasures from the Land of the Four Rivers (in China’s South-West) to the gardens of the world, such things as the Blue poppy, Meconopsis betonicafolia, and the ‘Dove Tree’, Davidia involucrata. In 1919 Wilson was collecting azaleas from the Kurume Prefecture of Kyushu and sent fifty of the best to be exhibited at the 1922 World Trade Exposition in San Francisco. The Woolrichs heard about these new and sensational ‘Kurume Azaleas’ and sent off for the collection. Some of Wilson’s original azaleas are still to be found in Cloudehill, and also in Rangeview, what is now our neighbour’s garden.

Chinese Wilson in those years divided his time between the Arnold Arboretum in the US and the Yokohama Nursery in Japan, sending plants to the Arnold from Yokohama. The Arnold Arboretum now highlights these due to their connection with Wilson and with the Yokohama Nursery. The Yokohama, I must add, was no ordinary nursery. It was a Meiji Period institution established by the leading Japanese horticulturalists to showcase their plants to the world. Any plant today to have originated from that nursery has serious international significance.

Under Wilson’s guidance, in 1928 a collection of plants was sent from Yokohama to the Woolrichs. A number of these are still growing in Cloudehill including the two glorious weeping maples, Acer palmatum Atropurpureum, on Cloudehill’s main terrace. There also the Oskasuki maple, Acer palmatum ‘Osakasuki’ (by the nursery car park) and specimens of Acer palmatum japonicumAconitifolium, Acer palmatum japonicum Aureum, Acer maximowiczianum (at the end of the Upper Meadow) and the colossal Magnolia denudata(at the bottom of the garden).  

Several shrubs near the Summer House also came from Yokohama including the pair of Enkianthus perulatus and an E. campanulatus all with tiny bell flowers in spring and brilliant autumn colour. Finally, there’s the deciduous and very rare Rhododendron schlippinbachii below Cloudehill’s Peony Pavilion steps, aglow with soft-pink bell flowers every spring.

Wilson also pointed the Woolrich brothers towards other people he thought might be helpful such as Fred Streeter in England. Fred was someone who could reliably supply named varieties of European Beech. (Beech have always been very tricky to propagate!) In 1928 a collection of beech was sent from London to the Dandenongs including the three tricolour beech, Fagus sylvatica Roseo-marginatas, (scattered around Cloudehill) and the two big copper beech, Fagus sylvatica Purpurea Group (in the top corner of the gardens) and the stunning Fernleaf beech, Fagus sylvatica heterophylla(on the main terrace).

Following Jim Woorich’s death in 1991, the property was purchased by Jeremy Francis and Valerie Campbell-Wemyss the following year. Work commenced after Easter with the marking out of where the Main Terrace should go and the digging of the two big weeping maples. Of course, it was known these were important and each one was hand dug over some two weeks, burlapped and roped, and moved to their present site by the same excavator hired in for the purpose of levelling the Terrace. There was also the small matter of 25 years’ worth of weeds to attend to. The terraces for the Quadrangle and Shrub Borders were excavated the following year, and the Theatre the year after that. Generally every couple of years and there has been another project and 30 years later they continue.

References

External links 
 
 Diggers Club products
 Diggers Foundation
 About The Diggers Club
 Become a Member

Mail-order retailers
Seed companies
Victorian places listed on the defunct Register of the National Estate